Larry Rosenberg (born December 7, 1932) is an American Buddhist teacher who founded the Cambridge Insight Meditation Center in Cambridge, Massachusetts, in 1985. He is also a resident teacher there. Rosenberg was a professor of psychology at the University of Chicago and Harvard Medical School. In addition to teaching at the Insight Meditation Center in Cambridge, he is also a senior teacher at the Insight Meditation Society in Barre, Massachusetts.

Rosenberg was born to Russian-Jewish immigrants and grew up in Coney Island in a working-class family. His father, who had Marxist leanings, came from 14 generations of rabbis.

Rosenberg got his BS at Brooklyn College and his Ph.D. in social psychology from the University of Chicago, where he also subsequently taught. He later became an assistant professor in the Department of Psychiatry at Harvard. Disappointed with his experience with the academia, he turned to intensive Buddhist practice. A major turning point
that influenced this decision was his introduction to the teachings of Jiddu Krishnamurti and Vimala Thakar. 
He received Zen training with Korean Master Seung Sahn and Japanese Master Katagiri Roshi for eight years before coming to Vipassana. Anagarika Munindra was his first Vipassana teacher.

His book Breath by Breath is a clear description of the practice of anapanasati (mindful breath meditation). His emphasis on the breath as an object of meditation was, in part, inspired by his encounter with the Thai meditation teacher Buddhadasa. 
Anapanasati also forms the basis of his teachings at the Cambridge Insight Meditation Center.

Books 
 L. Rosenberg, Breath by Breath: The Liberating Practice of Insight Meditation, Shambhala Publications, 2004. .
 L. Rosenberg and D. Guy, Living In the Light of Death: On the Art of Being Truly Alive, Shambhala Publications, 2001. 
 L. Rosenberg with Laura Zimmerman, Three Steps to Awakening: A Practice for Bringing Mindfulness to Life, Shambhala Publications, 2013.

References

External links
 Cambridge Insight Meditation Center
 Dharma Seed | Larry Rosenberg's Dharma Talks

1932 births
American people of Russian-Jewish descent
American Theravada Buddhists
Jewish American writers
Brooklyn College alumni
Harvard Medical School faculty
Living people
Buddhist writers
Converts to Buddhism
Converts to Buddhism from Judaism
Theravada Buddhist spiritual teachers
University of Chicago alumni
University of Chicago faculty
People from Coney Island
American non-fiction writers
Mindfulness (Buddhism)
21st-century American Jews